Filip Ivic (born 30 August 1992) is a Croatian handball player who plays for RK Zagreb and the Croatian national team.

References

External links
EHF profile

1992 births
Living people
Croatian male handball players
Vive Kielce players
Handball players from Zagreb
RK Zagreb players
Expatriate handball players in Poland
Croatian expatriate sportspeople in Poland
21st-century Croatian people